Czernina (pronounced: , from czarny --- "black"; sometimes also czarnina or czarna polewka --- black soup, or even "gray borscht", barszcz szary) is a Polish soup made of duck blood and clear poultry broth. Sometimes known as "duck soup", yet hen, rabbit or pig blood can also be used. In English it can be called "duck blood soup".

Flavours
Generally the sweet and sour taste of the soup comes from the balance of sugar and vinegar. However, there are hundreds of recipes popular in different parts of Poland, Belarus and Lithuania. Among the ingredients used are plum or pear syrup, dried pears, plums or cherries, apple vinegar and honey. Like most Polish soups, czernina is usually served with kluski, fine noodles, macaroni, boiled potatoes, or dumplings.

Symbol
Until the 19th century czernina was also a symbol in Polish culture. It was served to young men applying for the hand of their beloved. If the suitor was rejected, he would be served czernina. It is a plot element in Pan Tadeusz, a famous Polish epic poem by Adam Mickiewicz.

It is also a regional dish in Kashubia, Masuria and Poznań.

Czernina is very similar to Swedish svartsoppa.

See also
 Blood as food
 Duck blood and vermicelli soup
 Chicken and duck blood soup
 List of duck dishes
 List of soups
 Polish cuisine
 Tiết canh, a Vietnamese dish of raw duck blood

References

Polish soups
Blood soups
Duck dishes
Pomeranian cuisine
Polish cuisine